War Resisters' International (WRI), headquartered in London, is an international anti-war organisation with members and affiliates in over 30 countries.

History
War Resisters' International was founded in Bilthoven, Netherlands in 1921 under the name "Paco", which means "peace" in Esperanto. WRI adopted a founding declaration that has remained unchanged:

It adopted the broken rifle as its symbol in 1931.

Many of its founders had been involved in the resistance to the First World War: its first Secretary, Herbert Runham Brown, had spent two and a half years in a British prison as a conscientious objector. Two years later, in 1923, Tracy Dickinson Mygatt, Frances M. Witherspoon, Jessie Wallace Hughan, and John Haynes Holmes founded the War Resisters League in the United States.

Notable members include Dutch anarchist Bart de Ligt, Quaker Richard Gregg and Tolstoyan Valentin Bulgakov. The group had a close working relationships with sections of the Gandhian movement. In January 1948, Mohandas Karamchand Gandhi attended a preparatory meeting for the World Pacifist Meeting he called, at the behest of WRI, and which eventually took place in December 1949. It took the form of 50 international pacifists meeting with 25 of Gandhi's close associates in an "unhurried conference" in Santiniketan, West Bengal.

In the 1930s and 1940s, WRI helped to rescue people from persecution under Francisco Franco and under the Nazis and found them safe homes with WRI members in other countries. One of the leaders of the Norwegian branch of WRI (FmK), Olaf Kullmann, was arrested by the German Occupiers for his pacifist agitation; he was sent to the Sachsenhausen concentration camp, where he died 
in 1942.

During the Cold War, WRI consistently sought out war resisters in the Soviet bloc: first individuals, and later groups. After the 1968 invasion of Czechoslovakia, WRI organised protest demonstrations in four Warsaw Pact capitals.

Daniel Ellsberg's attendance at a talk by Randy Kehler (as Kehler was preparing to submit to his sentence for draft resistance) at the WRI's 13th Triennial Meeting, held at Haverford College in August 1969, was a pivotal event in Ellsberg's decision to copy and release the Pentagon Papers. (It was Ellsberg's release of the Pentagon Papers which led President Nixon to create a group of in-house spies, who undertook the ill-fated Watergate break-in, which led to Nixon's resignation).

In 1971, when Pakistani troops were blockading what was then East Pakistan, WRI launched Operation Omega to Bangladesh. More recently, the International Deserters Network associated with WRI has offered support for people resisting the Gulf War of 1991 and, on a much larger scale, the wars in the Balkans, where it was also engaged with several other peace organisations in an experiment in international nonviolent intervention, the Balkan Peace Team.

In 1988, a WRI advert was cited as one of the reasons for the seizure of an edition of the Weekly Mail in South Africa, after the banning of the local End Conscription Campaign.

The WRI office in London has supported three programmes: work on conscientious objection, supporting nonviolent movements against war and countering youth militarisation.

Organisation
War Resisters' International is a network of member groups. An international conference takes place at least once every four years.

The Chair has been elected at international conferences (Assembleys) or by postal vote in advance of the international conference. Since the office of chair was created in 1926, chairs have been:

Fenner Brockway (1926–1934)
Arthur, Lord Ponsonby (1934–1937)
George Lansbury (1937–1940)
Herbert Runham Brown (1946–1949)
Harold Bing (1949–1966)
Michael Randle (1966–1973)
Devi Prasad (1973–1975)
Myrtle Solomon (1975–1986)
David McReynolds (1986–1988)
Narayan Desai (1989–1991)
Jørgen Johansen (1991–1998)
Joanne Sheehan (1998–2006)
Howard Clark (2006–2013)
Christine Schweitzer (2014–2019, see german wikipedia)

The office of Chair has been abolished at the 2019 Assembly meeting in Bogotá, Colombia, and the former responsibilities of the Chair are now shared between the members of the executive committee.

See also
List of anti-war organizations
List of peace activists
Nonviolence
Pacifism
Antimilitarism
War resister
War Resisters League

References

Further reading
Clark, Howard: "War Resisters' International", in Encyclopaedia of Nonviolence, Garland Publishing 1997. See note on discussion page.
Prasad, Devi: War is a Crime against Humanity: The story of War Resisters' International, London: War Resisters' International 2005
Bennett, Scott. Radical Pacifism: The War Resisters League and Gandhian Nonviolence in America, 1915–1963.  Syracuse, NY: Syracuse University Press, 2003. 
Beyer, Wolfram. 60 years of the War Resisters' International (WRI) – with special reference to the period 1921 – 1939.  Berlin, 1985, published by 'Schriftenreihe des Libertären Forums Berlin' (English translation from German by Hilda Morris, GB – theses for diploma at the Free University of Berlin). 2.Edition >>War Resisters' International (WRI) the political insight of the WRI with special reference to the period 1921 – 1939<<, Berlin 2018

External links

Peace organisations based in the United Kingdom
International organisations based in London
Conscientious objection organizations
Organisations based in the London Borough of Islington
Organizations established in 1921
Direct action